Christopher James Mann (19 March 1872–1949) was an English footballer who played in the Football League for Aston Villa and Burton United.

References

1872 births
1962 deaths
English footballers
Association football defenders
English Football League players
Middlesbrough F.C. players
Aston Villa F.C. players
Burton United F.C. players
Gresley F.C. players